The 2012–13 Boston University Terriers men's basketball team represented Boston University during the 2012–13 NCAA Division I men's basketball season. The Terriers, led by second year head coach Joe Jones, played their home games at Case Gym and were members of the America East Conference. This was their final year in the America East as they will join the Patriot League in July 2013. Due to the coming conference change, the Terriers were not eligible to participate in the 2013 America East tournament. They finished the season 17–13, 11–5 in America East play to finish in a tie for second place. They were invited to the 2013 CIT where they lost in the first round to Loyola (MD).

Roster

Schedule

|-
!colspan=9| Regular season

|-
!colspan=9| 2013 CIT

References

Boston University Terriers men's basketball seasons
Boston U
Boston U
Boston University Terriers men's basketball team
 Boston University Terriers men's basketball team